Calamita melanorabdotus  is a possible species of frog reported from Brazil in 1799. The status of this name placed in the subfamily Hylinae is unclear; Some authorities consider it to be a junior synonym of Hyla lactea, while others consider it a nomen dubium.

References

Hylinae
Taxa named by Johann Gottlob Theaenus Schneider
Amphibians described in 1799
Taxonomy articles created by Polbot